Episode 001: Chasing Hayley is the debut EP by New Zealand hip-hop band, Kidz in Space. It was released by Universal Music Group New Zealand on 31 August 2009.

Critical reception
Jonny Carson from NZ Musician compared Episode 001: Chasing Hayley to the work of The Black Eyed Peas and LMFAO, and called it "one small step for Kidz In Space, one giant leap for NZ hip hop".

Track listing
 "Cupids Got a Shotgun" – 4:46
 "Psychedelic Girl" (featuring Alisa Xayalith) – 3:13
 "Beauty Queen" – 2:52
 "Downtime" – 3:28
 "Lose My Cool" – 3:00
 "Phone Call" (featuring Coco Solid) – 3:20
 "Ocean of Drugs" – 3:23

References

2009 debut EPs
Hip hop EPs